David Mackie (born May 9, 1994) is a professional Canadian football fullback for the BC Lions of the Canadian Football League (CFL).

University career
Mackie played U Sports football with the Western Mustangs from 2014 to 2017 where he was a member of the 53rd Vanier Cup championship team in 2017.

Professional career
Mackie was drafted in the second round, 16th overall, in the 2018 CFL Draft by the BC Lions. He signed with the Lions on May 17, 2018 and made his professional debut on June 29, 2018 against the Edmonton Eskimos. Mackie signed a one-year contract extension with the BC Lions on January 7, 2021.

On June 25, 2022, in a game against the Toronto Argonauts, Mackie replaced the injured James Butler at running back to start the second half where he had 16 carries for 90 yards and his first career touchdown on a one-yard run.

References

External links
BC Lions bio

1994 births
Living people
BC Lions players
Canadian football fullbacks
Western Mustangs football players
Players of Canadian football from Ontario